Escape is a studio album by guitarists Jody Harris and Robert Quine, released in 1981 through the label Infidelity.

Track listing

Personnel 
Jody Harris – guitar, bass guitar, percussion, production
Myers/Kesel – design
Robert Quine – guitar, bass guitar, percussion, production
Marcia Resnick – photography

References

External links

1981 debut albums
Robert Quine albums